Acacia heteroneura is a shrub belonging to the genus Acacia and the subgenus Juliflorae that is endemic to western Australia.

Description
It has branchlets that are sericeous between the glabrous and resinous ribbing. Like most species of Acacia it has phyllodes rather than true leaves. The phyllodes have a linear to compressed-rhombic shape and are flat or sometimes terete. It blooms from January to December producing yellow flowers. The simple inflorescences occur singly or in pairs in the axils. The seed pods that form after flowering are usually erect, with a linear shape and are straight or quadrangular-terete.

Taxonomy
It lends its name to the A. heteroneura group along with Acacia cylindrica, Acacia desertorum and Acacia epedunculata, it is most closely related to A. desertorum. 
Four varieties are recognized :
Acacia heteroneura var. heteroneura
Acacia heteroneura var. jutsonii 
Acacia heteroneura var. putila
Acacia heteroneura var. prolixa

Distribution
It is native to an area in the Goldfields, Wheatbelt and Pilbara regions of Western Australia where it has a scattered distribution. It is often situated on dunes, sandplains, ridges, and lateritic rises growing in gravelly sandy-loam soils. The bulk of the population is found from around Wubin in the west, to Wiluna in the north east and Lake King in the south east and out to Queen Victoria Spring Nature Reserve in the east where it is usually a part of open scrubland communities.

See also
List of Acacia species

References

heteroneura
Acacias of Western Australia
Plants described in 1855
Taxa named by George Bentham